Purum (Purum Naga) is a Southern Naga language of India. Speakers consider themselves to be ethnic Naga people, rather than part of the Kuki and Chin ethnic groups. Peterson (2017) classifies Purum as part of the Northwestern branch of Kuki-Chin. According Ethnologue, Purum shares a high degree of mutual intelligibility with Kharam.

Geographical distribution
Purum is spoken in Phaijol, Laikot, Thuisenpai, and Kharam Pallen villages of Senapati district, Manipur (Ethnologue).

References

Languages of Manipur
Endangered languages of India
Southern Naga languages